The Abuli fortress is a Bronze Age megalithic structure formerly located in the first georgian kingdom of Diauehi, now in the Akhalkalaki Municipality in Georgia's southern region of Samtskhe-Javakheti. A cyclopean fort built using a dry masonry technique, it is located on the southern slope of Mount Patara Abuli, at an elevation of 2670 meters above sea level, in the Lesser Caucasus mountains, southwest of Paravani Lake. The fortress is inscribed on the list of the Immovable Cultural Monuments of National Significance of Georgia.

Architecture 

The Abuli fortress, locally known also as Korogli (ultimately from Turkic Koroğlu), shares many architectural features with the Shaori fortress, another major cyclopean hillfort strategically located in the area around Paravani Lake. 

The Abuli fortress is a large and complex structure, built of 3-5-meter-high volcanic basalt blocks, without using mortar. It consists of the central fortified area, which includes the "citadel" with an area of 60×40 meter. The central area can be accessed through two gates from the south and the east. Dwellings or hideouts, of various size and shape, sometimes organized in two or three levels, comprise the so-called "residential area" and spread to the east of the "citadel".

Archaeological background  
No archaeological excavations have been carried out at Abuli and Shaori, making it difficult to precisely date or assign them to any particular culture. In general, the spread of cyclopean fortresses is an archaeological testimony to the social changes in the South Caucasus in the Middle-to-Late Bronze Age, reflecting social differentiation and emergence of newly empowered elites. These forts were typically constructed on the steep slopes of mountains. Settlement distribution and cultural material suggest that those in charge of these hill forts exercised control over arable land and resources, but they may also have provided economic and defensive functions for their hinterlands. In September 2019, a multiyear archaeological research project was launched by Georgia's culture heritage authorities for further study and conservation of the country's megalithic complexes, including those at Abuli, Shaori, Avranlo, and Sameba.

References 

Buildings and structures in Samtskhe–Javakheti
Immovable Cultural Monuments of National Significance of Georgia
Castles and forts in Georgia (country)
Prehistoric Georgia (country)